Gustaf Allan Lindh (May 21, 1926 – September 3, 2015) was a former Swedish modern pentathlete who competed in the winter pentathlon in the 1948 Winter Olympics. He was born in Tätort Liden, Sundsvall Municipality.

Gustaf Lindh is the only Olympic champion in Winter Pentathlon. Winter pentathlon was a one-time event solely held at the Olympic Games in 1948 in St. Moritz. Sweden had four participants, including the future Olympic champion in modern pentathlon, William Grut. Grut, Claes Egnell und Bertil Haase were about ten years older than Lindh and at that time the dominant athletes in winter pentathlon, but Lindh went on to beat the favourites. He won the shooting and riding with the only flaw being a sixth rank in the downhill event. His teammate Haase won the downhill and the 10 km cross country as he was an excellent skier, but did not finish tops in shooting, fencing and riding.
Grut showed a balanced performance, but Lindh finished a point ahead of him and Haase. The fourth Swede, Egnell, broke his leg in the downhill, and had to abandon the competition in fourth place.

Like all other participants, Lindh was also a member of the armed forces. At age seventeen, he had joined the Swedish Army in Östersund because of the lack of educational opportunities during World War II. He attended military school (Swedish: volontär–, konstapel– och furirskola) as a furir (Private First Class) and excelled in winter sports. Already in his third appearance in a Winter Pentathlon in 1946, he won the Swedish championship and thus qualified for the Olympic Games. In autumn 1948, he was dismissed from the military and began training in the field of energy technology at the Tekniska Fackskolan (Technical Vocational School) in Sundsvall, then worked as an engineer and designer for high-voltage lines. He continued his sports activities until a shattered jaw after a horse riding accident in Stockholm forced him to retire in 1954 and set an end to his career.

Lindh spent some years in the United States, went back to Sweden at the end of the 1960s and lived since in Viksjö, Järfälla northwest of Stockholm.

References

1926 births
2015 deaths
Swedish male modern pentathletes
Olympic modern pentathletes of Sweden
Olympic gold medalists for Sweden
Medalists at the 1948 Winter Olympics
People from Sundsvall Municipality
Sportspeople from Västernorrland County